Moškrin is a small settlement in the Municipality of Škofja Loka in the Upper Carniola region of Slovenia.

References

External links

Moškrin at Geopedia

Populated places in the Municipality of Škofja Loka